The Taichung Mayor's House is a former residence of Taichung Mayor in North District, Taichung, Taiwan.

History
The building was originally built in 1929 for Japanese optometrist Miyahara Takeo under the name Miyahara Residence. After the handover of Taiwan from Japan to the Republic of China, the building became the property of Taichung City Government and housed the official residence of Taichung Mayor. In 2002, the residence was declared a historical building. In 2004, the Cultural Affairs Bureau of the city government converted into a public arts and cultural center for exhibitions and performances.

Architecture
The building is a Japanese-style mansion consists of two floors.

Transportation
The building is accessible within walking distance north of Taichung Station of Taiwan Railways.

See also
 Mayor of Taichung

References

2004 establishments in Taiwan
Buildings and structures in Taichung
Houses completed in 1929
Mayors' mansions in Taiwan